Naming is assigning a name to something.

Naming may refer to:
 Naming (parliamentary procedure), a procedure in certain parliamentary bodies
 Naming ceremony, an event at which an infant is named
 Product naming, the discipline of deciding what a product will be called

See also 

 Nomenclature
 Name (disambiguation)